Lars-Börje "Bulan" Eriksson (born 21 October 1966) is a Swedish former alpine skier. He surprisingly won a bronze medal in the super-G competition at the 1988 Winter Olympics in Calgary.  Later he also won two World Cup victories, one in super-G and one in giant slalom.  He finished his skiing career in 1992, after having struggled with an injury from a bone fracture during downhill training in the 1991 World Championships.

World Cup victories

References

1966 births
Swedish male alpine skiers
Alpine skiers at the 1988 Winter Olympics
Olympic alpine skiers of Sweden
Medalists at the 1988 Winter Olympics
Olympic medalists in alpine skiing
Olympic bronze medalists for Sweden
People from Åre Municipality
Living people
Sportspeople from Jämtland County